Campana is a city in the province of Buenos Aires, Argentina. It is the seat of the Campana Partido.

Campana and Zárate make up an important industrial region. The city is linked to Zárate and the Zárate-Brazo Largo Bridge (and from there to Mesopotamia) by Provincial Route 6. The Pan-American Highway (Route 9) links Campana to Buenos Aires, Rosario, Córdoba and the north of Argentina.

The village of Campana was officially created in 1875. It was on July 6th, 1885 that Campana Partido was created as an offshoot of the Exaltación de la Cruz Partido.

Campana has been since late 19th century and to a lesser degree today an important shipyard and port for passengers traveling to the remote Ibicuy Islands of the Paraná Delta.

Japanese automobile manufacturer Honda opened a factory in 2011, where it has built the Honda City and Honda HR-V.

Demographics
Campana has a total of 94,333 inhabitants (INDEC, 2010).

Population origins

Most of the city's population consists almost entirely by descendants of Italian and Spanish (mostly Galicians) immigrants, although there are other minorities such as Germans, British, French and Roms. In recent years there has been a slight increase in population from East Asia (China and South Korea) and Latin American countries like Bolivia, Paraguay and Peru.

Sports
Campana is home to Club Villa Dálmine, a football club that plays in Argentina's regionalised 2nd division, and to Puerto Nuevo, an older club that plays in 5th division.

Notes

References
  Municipality of Campana - Official website.
 

Paraná River
Populated places established in 1885
Populated places in Buenos Aires Province
Port settlements in Argentina
Cities in Argentina
Argentina